The 2009 Open Tarragona Costa Daurada was a professional tennis tournament played on outdoor red clay courts. It was the fourth edition of the tournament which was part of the 2009 ATP Challenger Tour. It took place in Tarragona, Spain between 5 and 11 October 2009.

Singles main draw entrants

Seeds

 Rankings are as of September 28, 2009.

Other entrants
The following players received wildcards into the singles main draw:
  Arnau Brugués-Davi
  Iñigo Cervantes-Huegun
  Sergio Gutiérrez-Ferrol
  David Valeriano

The following players received entry from the qualifying draw:
  Alberto Brizzi
  Marc Fornell-Mestres
  Philipp Oswald (as a Lucky loser)
  Albert Ramos-Viñolas
  Guillaume Rufin

Champions

Singles

 Daniel Gimeno Traver def.  Paolo Lorenzi, 6–4, 6–0

Doubles

 Tomasz Bednarek /  Mateusz Kowalczyk def.  Flavio Cipolla /  Alessandro Motti, 6–1, 6–1

External links
Official website
ITF Search 
2009 Draws

Open Tarragona Costa Daurada
Open Tarragona Costa Daurada
Tarra